Chor Lau-heung is a Taiwanese television series adapted from Chu Liuxiang Xinzhuan of Gu Long's Chu Liuxiang novel series. Adam Cheng starred as the titular protagonist, Chor Lau-heung (Cantonese for "Chu Liuxiang"). The series was divided into four parts, each lasting 4 to 6 episodes and with a different director. It was first broadcast on CTV in Taiwan in 1985. The series is an unofficial sequel to the 1979 Hong Kong TVB TV series of the same title, with the story continuing from where the 1979 series left off. The character Su Rongrong does not appear in this series because the character died at the end of the 1979 series.

Plot

Part 1: Legend of New Moon (新月傳奇)
News of Xinyue's marriage to Shi Tianwang cause much excitement in the jianghu (martial artists' community). However, the princess goes missing suddenly and Chu Liuxiang is accused of having kidnapped her, and he becomes the primary target of many martial artists. Chu is unable to explain himself and can only promise to find the princess within ten days. He encounters a wide range of perils during his quest to find the missing princess.

Part 2: Legend of the Orchid (蘭花傳奇)
A strange orchid is said to hold a big secret of the jianghu. Several martial artists are eager to get the flower and start fighting among themselves. A mysterious killer goes around murdering innocent people, leaving behind an orchid beside each victim's body. Chu Liuxiang decides to investigate the case and unravel the mystery.

Part 3: Legend of the Parrot (鸚鵡傳奇)
The White Jade Parrot, a treasure of the Loulan Kingdom, has been stolen. Tie Hen, the best constable in Loulan, is sent to investigate the theft. Chu Liuxiang is among the suspects.

Part 4: Legend of the Shadow (影子傳奇)
On the night of the full moon, members of the five major martial arts schools die mysteriously from unnatural causes. The schools get Chu Liuxiang to help them find out the truth within three months. Chu trails the shadow of a mysterious person and finds something suspicious about his girlfriend, Shen Wuxin. His investigation further leads him to an unsolved mystery 20 years ago. At the same time, Shen's brother is planning to dominate the jianghu.

Cast

Part 1

 Adam Cheng as Chu Liuxiang
 Michelle Yim as Su Rongrong / Su Mangmang
 Eddy Ko as Hu Tiehua
 Huang Hui-wen as Princess Xinyue
 Shen Hai-jung as Mister Du
 Hsiang Peng-yun as Jiao Lin
 Koon Jing-wah as Yingzi
 Chen Mei-chun as Li Hongxiu
 Chiang Li-li as Song Tian'er
 Fang Mian as Eunuch Qin

Part 2

 Adam Cheng as Chu Liuxiang
 Ching Li as Su Su
 Eddy Ko as Hu Tiehua
 Chiang Hou-jen as Murong Qingyun
 Wu Feng as Zuo Qinghou
 Lin Ling as Zuo Piaopiao
 Lin Hsiu-chun as Madam Yu
 Kuo Yen-yen as Shuiyin
 Chen Li-hua as Taiyang
 Kung Lien-hua as Wuse
 Cheng Peng as Shangguan Dao
 Yu Shih-keng as Xiaoshuidi
 Li Chiang as Daonu
 Yi Chiang as Shui Linglong
 Lin Kuang-jung as Granny Ding
 Su Kuo-liang as Liu Mingqiu
 Yang Chi-tung as Wujie

Part 3

 Adam Cheng as Chu Liuxiang
 Chen Yu-mei as Xuenu
 Lucifer Lee as Hu Tiehua
 Hsiang Yun-peng as Tie Hen
 Tie Meng-chiu as Loulan King
 Liu Hsiao-ping as Queen
 Lin Hsiu-chun as Tang Yu
 Tu Tai-feng as Song Bieli
 Mei Chang-fen as Li Hongxiu
 Lu Hsiao-huang as Song Tian'er

Part 4

 Adam Cheng as Chu Liuxiang
 Chiu Shu-yi as Shen Wuxin
 Teng Mei-fang as Lian Furong
 Li Hai-hsing as Hu Tiehua
 Hua Lun as Yuan Wenxiu
 Cheng Peng as Yue Wushuang
 Liu Lin as Wu Buzhi
 Li Chiang as Zhong Kui
 Kuan Hung as Laosaoba
 Mei Changfen as Li Hongxiu
 Lu Hsiao-huang as Song Tian'er
 Tu Tai-feng as Yu Keren
 Lin Kuang-jung as Li San
 Pai Lung as Bai Wuchang
 Chen Min-hua as Hei Wuchang

External links

1985 Taiwanese television series debuts
1986 Taiwanese television series endings
Taiwanese wuxia television series
Works based on Chu Liuxiang (novel series)
1980s Taiwanese television series
Television shows based on works by Gu Long